Epicentric, Inc., was an enterprise software company and a provider of enterprise portal solutions for Global 2000 companies.  Made popular by custom portal sites like My Yahoo!, enterprise portals enabled businesses (primarily enterprise companies) to deliver integrated Web services to their customers (Internet), partners (Extranet) and employees (Intranet). The company was founded in 1998 by Wired.com executive Ed Anuff and TouchWave executive Oliver Muoto, both startup veterans, in San Francisco, California.  The company had over 300 employees and 350 Global 2000 customers before it was acquired by Vignette (VIGN) in December 2002.

History
The company was founded by Ed Anuff and Oliver Muoto in 1998. The company received Series A funding from Outlook Ventures, New Vista Capital and Innovacom Ventures (investment arm of France Telecom).

Products

 Epicentric Foundation Server
 Epicentric Application Builder
 Epicentric Module Marketplace

Investors
Investors included JP Morgan, Outlook Ventures, New Vista Capital, Motorola
 and others.

Competitors

Competitors include Plumtree Software (now BEA Systems), IBM, and Oracle Corporation.

Acquisitions
Epicentric acquired Application Park, a web-services tools company, in 2001. In December 2002, Epicentric was acquired by Austin, TX-based Vignette Corp.

References

External links
Vignette.com - official website

Companies based in San Francisco
Software companies based in the San Francisco Bay Area
1998 establishments in California
2002 disestablishments in California
Defunct software companies of the United States